Kåre Björkstrand (born 31 March 1987) is a Finnish footballer who last played for Finnish Veikkausliiga club FF Jaro.

Personal life
He is the identical twin brother of Sebastian Björkstrand and brother of Sixten Björkstrand.

References

External links
  Profile at veikkausliiga.com
  Profile at ffjaro.fi

1987 births
Living people
Finnish footballers
FF Jaro players
Veikkausliiga players
FC Viikingit players
FC Kiisto players
Association football midfielders
Association football defenders
GBK Kokkola players